Wajid is a family name and male given name.

Wajida is a feminine form of Wajid.

It is of Arabic origin (لڑكا) meaning one who perceives or finds. It is a Muslim theophoric name, from Al-Wajid (الواجد), one of the 99 names of God in the Qur'an, which signifies The Finder, The All-Perceiving, The Inventor and Maker.

Notable people named Wajid and Wajida
Wajid Ali Shah (1822–1887), Indian ruler
Syed Wajid Ali (1911–2008), Pakistani sports person (ex chairman Pakistan Olympic Association)
S. Wajid Ali (1890–1951), Bengali nationalist
Wajid Khan (born 1946), Canadian politician
Wajid Nashad (1955–2008), Pakistani composer
Wajid Ali, Indian film musician, one half of the duo Sajid–Wajid
Wajida Tabassum (1935-2011), Indian writer

References

Arabic masculine given names